Trevor Foster Grimwood (born 8 November 1948) is a former Australian rules footballer who played with Port Adelaide and West Adelaide in the SANFL.

Grimwood's first attempt at a career in the SANFL was unsuccessful, he was on the books for Norwood in both 1965 and 1966 but didn't play a senior game. A rover, he got his second chance in 1971 when he was picked up by Port Adelaide with whom he would play 33 games over three years. In 1974 he crossed to West Adelaide and won their best and fairest award in 1976. His best season came the following season when he won the 1977 Magarey Medal by ten votes. Grimwood finished with 101 games for West Adelaide; he would have played more if he had not suffered from constant hamstring problems.

On 28 November 2011, Grimwood was sentenced to six years imprisonment with a non-parole period of two-and-a-half years for having sexual intercourse with a 14-year-old girl in 1985 and 1986.

References

External links

1948 births
Living people
Port Adelaide Football Club (SANFL) players
Port Adelaide Football Club players (all competitions)
West Adelaide Football Club players
Magarey Medal winners
Australian rules footballers from South Australia
Australian people convicted of child sexual abuse